Esine is a comune in the province of Brescia, in the Italian region Lombardy, in the Camonica valley, located  north of Brescia.

It is bounded by other communes of Berzo Inferiore, Bovegno, Cividate Camuno, Darfo Boario Terme, Gianico, Piancogno.

Twin Towns - Sister Cities 
Esine is twinned with:

 Civitanova Marche in Italy (since 1989)

References

Cities and towns in Lombardy